Vladimir Gluščević (Cyrillic: Владимир Глушчевић; born 20 October 1979) is a retired Montenegrin footballer who last played for Hapoel Haifa.

Club career
Czech Sparta Prague, Montenegrin FK Budućnost Podgorica, Serbian FK Borac Čačak and FK Rad and Romanian FC Politehnica Timișoara were the clubs he represented beside his first professional club FK Mogren where he returned in summer 2007, and where he won the Montenegrin Championship in the 2008–09 season.

International career
Gluščević made his debut for Montenegro in a November 2009 friendly match against Belarus, coming on as a final minute substitute for Simon Vukčević. It remained his sole international appearance.

Personal life
Vladimir's older brother, Igor Gluščević, was also a footballer.

Honours
Sparta Prague
Czech Cup: 2003–04
Mogren
Montenegrin First League: 2008–09, 2010–11
Montenegrin Cup: 2007–08

References

External links
 Profile and 2009-10 stats at Montenegrin FA
 Statistics at Divizia A
 
 
 
 

1979 births
Living people
People from Kotor
Association football forwards
Serbia and Montenegro footballers
Montenegrin footballers
Montenegro international footballers
FK Mogren players
AC Sparta Prague players
FK Budućnost Podgorica players
FK Borac Čačak players
FK Rad players
FC Politehnica Timișoara players
Albacete Balompié players
Hapoel Haifa F.C. players
First League of Serbia and Montenegro players
Second League of Serbia and Montenegro players
Czech First League players
Liga I players
Montenegrin First League players
Segunda División players
Israeli Premier League players
Serbia and Montenegro expatriate footballers
Expatriate footballers in the Czech Republic
Serbia and Montenegro expatriate sportspeople in the Czech Republic
Montenegrin expatriate footballers
Expatriate footballers in Romania
Montenegrin expatriate sportspeople in Romania
Expatriate footballers in Spain
Montenegrin expatriate sportspeople in Spain
Expatriate footballers in Israel
Montenegrin expatriate sportspeople in Israel